Costosyrnola is a genus of sea snails, marine gastropod mollusks in the family Pyramidellidae, the pyrams and their allies. This genus was formerly authorized by Laws in 1937.

Species
Species within the genus Costosyrnola include:
 Costosyrnola nitidissima (Issel, 1869)
 Costosyrnola thailandica (Robba, Di Geronimo, Chaimanee, Negri & Sanfilippo, 2004)

References

External links
 To World Register of Marine Species

Pyramidellidae